A referendum on fire insurance was held in Liechtenstein on 7 February 1926. Voters were asked whether a state insurance scheme for fire damage should be established. The proposal was rejected by 65.8% of voters.

Results

References

1926 referendums
1926 in Liechtenstein
1926
February 1926 events